The governor of Chiapas is the chief executive of the Mexican state of Chiapas. The state constitution stipulates a term of 6 years, to which governors can only be elected once. It also specifies the qualifications for becoming governor: a Mexican citizen by birth, aged at least 30 years old, and having not less than 5 years residency in Chiapas. The current governor is Rutilio Escandón from the MRN, who assumed the position in 2018.

 1825–1826: Manuel José de Rojas
 1826–1830: José Diego Lara
 1829: Emeterio Pineda
 1830–1834: Joaquín Miguel Gutiérrez
 1830: Emeterio Pineda
 1830: José Rafael Coello
 1830–1832: José Ignacio Gutiérrez
 1832: Manuel Escandón
 1832: Mariano José Correa
 1832: Joaquín Miguel Gutiérrez
 1832: Emeterio Pineda
 1832–1833: Quirino Domínguez
 1833: Joaquín Miguel Gutiérrez
 1833: Emeterio Pineda
 1833–1834: Joaquín Miguel Gutiérrez
 1834–1835: Joaquín Miguel Gutiérrez
 1835: José Mariano Coello
 1835: Ignacio Tovilla
 1835–1836: Mariano Montes de Oca
 1836–1837: Clemente Aceituno
 1836: Salvador Piñeiro
 1836: Onofre Reyes
 1837–1840: José María Sandoval
 1840–1841: José Diego Lara
 1841–1842: Salvador Ayanegui
 1842–1845: Ignacio Barberena
 1845–1848: Jerónimo Cardona
 1846–1847: Nicolás Ruiz
 1847–1848: Jerónimo Cardona
 1848: Manuel María Parada
 1848: Jerónimo Cardona
 1848: Ponciano Solórzano del Barco
 1848–1849: Fernando Nicolás Maldonado
 1849–1850: Ramón Larraínzar
 1850–1855: Fernando Nicolás Maldonado
 1851: José Farrera
 1851–1853: Fernando Nicolás Maldonado
 1853: Domingo Ruiz Molina
 1853–1855: Fernando Nicolás Maldonado
 1855–1856: Ángel Albino Corzo
 1856: Domingo Ruiz Molina
 1856–1861: Ángel Albino Corzo
 1857: Francisco Robles
 1858: Ángel Albino Corzo
 1858–1859: Matías Castellanos
 1859–1861: Ángel Albino Corzo
 1861: Juan Clímaco Corzo
 1861: Ángel Albino Corzo
 1861–1863: Juan Clímaco Corzo
 1863–1864: José Gabriel Esquinca
 1864–1865: José Pantaleón Domínguez
 1866: José Mariano García
 1866–1875: Without information.
 1875–1876: Moisés Rojas
 1876: Carlos Borda
 1876: Eleuterio Villasana
 1876: Manuel Cerón
 1877: Diego Betanzos
 1877: Sebastián Escobar
 1877: Nicolás Ruiz
 1877–1878: Sebastián Escobar
 1878–1879: Juan José Ramírez
 1879: Mariano Aguilar
 1879–1883: Miguel Utrilla
 1883–1886: José María Ramírez
 1886: Adrián Culebro
 1886–1887: José María Ramírez
 1887: Manuel Carrascosa
 1888: Miguel Utrilla
 1888–1891: Manuel Carrascosa
 1891–1893: Emilio Rabasa
 1893: Raúl del Pino
 1893–1894: Emilio Rabasa
 1894–1895: Fausto Moguel
 1895: Francisco León
 1896: José María González
 1896–1899: Francisco León
 1899: Luis Farrera
 1899: Francisco León
 1899: Rafael Pimentel
 1900: Abraham A. López
 1901–1902: Rafael Pimentel
 1902–1903: Onofre Ramos
 1903–1904: Rafael Pimentel
 1904: Onofre Ramos
 1905: Rafael Pimentel
 1905: Onofre Ramos
 1905: Rafael Pimentel
 1905: Miguel Castillo
 1905: Ramón Rabasa
 1906: Abraham A. López
 1906–1908: Ramón Rabasa
 1908: Abraham A. López
 1908–1909: Ramón Rabasa
 1909: José Inés Cano
 1909: Abraham A. López
 1909–1910: Ramón Rabasa
 1910: José Inés Cano
 1910–1911: Ramón Rabasa
 1911: José Inés Cano
 1911: Manuel Trejo
 1911: Ramón Rabasa
 1911: Manuel Trejo
 1911: Reynaldo Gordillo León
 1911: Policarpio Rueda Fernández
 1911: Manuel Rovelo Argüello
 1911: Marco Aurelio Solís
 1911–1912: Reynaldo Gordillo León
 1912–1913: Flavio Guillén
 1913: Marco Aurelio Solís
 1913: Reynaldo Gordillo León
 1913–1914: Bernardo Palafox
 1913–1914: Bernardo Palafox
 1914: José Inés Cano
 1914: José María Marín
 1914: Jesús Agustín Castro
 1914: Blas Corral
 1914–1915: Jesús Agustín Castro
 1915: Blas Corral
 1915: Jesús Agustín Castro
 1916: Blas Corral
 1916: José Ascención González
 1916: Blas Corral
 1916–1917: Pablo Villanueva
 1917–1918: Manuel Fuentes A.
 1918–1919: Pablo Villanueva
 1919: Manuel Fuentes A.
 1919: Pablo Villanueva
 1919–1920: Pascual Morales Molina
 1920: Alejo González
 1920: Francisco G. Ruíz
 1920: Juan Zertuche
 1920: Fausto Ruíz
 1920: Francisco G. Ruíz
 1920: Amadeo Ruíz
 1920–1924: Tiburcio Fernández Ruíz
 1921: Benigno Cal y Mayor
 1922: Tiburcio Fernández Ruíz
 1922: Amadeo Ruíz
 1922–1923: Tiburcio Fernández Ruíz
 1923: Manuel Encarnación Cruz
 1923–1924: Tiburcio Fernández Ruíz
 1924: Rogelio García Castro
 1924: Tiburcio Fernández Ruíz
 1924: Luis García
 1924: Martín Paredes
 1924: Tiburcio Fernández Ruíz
 1924: Raúl de León
 1924: Luis Ramírez Corzo
 1925: César Córdova
 1925: Carlos A. Vidal
 1925: José Castañón
 1925–1926: Carlos A. Vidal
 1926: J. Amilcar Vidal
 1927: Luis P. Vidal
 1927: Manuel Alvarez
 1927–1928: Federico Martínez Rojas
 1928: Amador Coutiño
 1928: Rosendo Delabre Santeliz
 1928–1929: Raymundo E. Enríquez
 1929: Ernesto Constantino Herrera
 1929: Alvaro Cancino
 1930: Martín G. Cruz
 1930: Alvaro Cancino
 1930: Moisés E. Villers
 1930: Alberto Domínguez R.
 1931: José María Brindís
 1931: Raúl León
 1932: Mariano G. A. Enríquez
 1932: Rodolfo Ruíz G.
 1932: Moisés Enríquez
 1932: Raymundo Enríquez
 1932–1936: Victórico R. Grajales
 1936–1940: Efraín A. Gutiérrez
 1940–1944: Rafael Pascacio Gamboa
 1944–1947: Juan M. Esponda
 1947–1948: César A. Lara
 1948–1952: Francisco J. Grajales
 1952–1958: Efraín Aranda Osorio
 1958–1964: Samuel León Brindis
 1964–1970: José Castillo Tielemans
 1970–1976: Manuel Velasco Suárez
 1976–1977: Jorge de la Vega Domínguez
 1977–1979: Salomón González Blanco
 1979–1982: Juan Sabines Gutiérrez
 1982: Gustavo Armendáriz
 1982–1988: Absalón Castellanos Domínguez
 1988–1993: Patrocinio González Garrido
 1993–1994: Elmar Setzer Marseille
 1994: Javier López Moreno
 1994–1995: Eduardo Robledo Rincón
 1995–1998: Julio César Ruíz Ferro
 1998–2000: Roberto Albores Guillén
 2000–2006: Pablo Salazar
 2006–2012: Juan Sabines
 2012–2018: Manuel Velasco Coello
 2018–present: Rutilio Escandón

References
 Cal y Mayor Redondo, Alberto. Notario Público. 2002. "Los gobernadores de Chiapas”. Tuxtla Gutiérrez, Chiapas, México. In Spanish.

External links
 List of governors of Chiapas

Chiapas
1825 establishments in Mexico